Greig Fraser, (born 3 October 1975) is an Australian cinematographer who studied at the RMIT University. His most well-known work includes the films Zero Dark Thirty (2012), Lion (2016), Rogue One (2016), Vice (2018), Dune (2021), and The Batman (2022).

Career
For his short film Cracker Bag he was nominated for Best Cinematography at the 2003 AFI Awards.

For his work on Lion, he won the American Society of Cinematographers Award for Outstanding Achievement in Cinematography in Theatrical Releases and AACTA Award for Best Cinematography and received Academy Award and BAFTA Award nominations.

Fraser shot Rogue One on the Arri Alexa 65 large format digital camera and Panavision lenses from the 1970s, making it the first feature film shot entirely with the Alexa 65. Fraser said of working with the Alexa 65, "The images are sharper and have more resolution, and those things are an advantage, but for me it is about the depth of the image -- there is a three-dimensionality to it. Often the beauty came from the texture; we found that the camera excelled when we were filming something with texture; it really enhanced the quality of picture."

Fraser returned to the Star Wars franchise with the 2019 television series The Mandalorian. In 2020, for his work on the series, Fraser won the Primetime Emmy Award for Outstanding Cinematography for a Single-Camera Series (Half-Hour).

For his work on Dune he won his first Academy Award for Best Cinematography in 2022. Fraser said a feature of his work in that film was intentionally using simple compositions, "We tried to simplify the frames as much as we could. By doing that, we've been able to give the viewers that absorption of story and experience" and colour palette: "We tried quite hard to make sure that it all sat within a certain tone."

Personal life
Fraser met costume designer Jodie Fried in Sydney in 2004, while they were working on a short film. After moving to the United States in 2008, they were married in a helicopter above Las Vegas. They live in Los Angeles with their three children.

Critical reception
Film critic Glenn Kenny has praised Fraser's work in The Batman and Dune, saying they were a "sort of stunning magic trick": "There's both a gauziness and a heft to his imagery. His use of shadow and silhouette is masterful, and does so much to convey a sense of foreboding and tension." Fellow cinematographer and Academy Award winner Roger Deakins praised Fraser's work on The Batman as "extraordinary", and called Fraser's and the film's omission from being nominated in the category at the 95th Academy Awards due to the Academy's tendency to avoid superhero films based on "snobbery."

Critic Susan Wloszczyna praised his work on Lion, saying it was "visually poetic".

Filmography
Film

Television

Awards and nominations

Notes

References

External links
 

1975 births
Living people
Australian cinematographers
Australian emigrants to the United States
Artists from Melbourne
RMIT University alumni
Best Cinematography BAFTA Award winners
Primetime Emmy Award winners
Best Cinematographer Academy Award winners